Cape Baily Light is an active lighthouse located at Cape Baily, a headland at the south side of the entrance to Botany Bay, New South Wales, Australia. The light serves to help north-bound shipping hug the coast to avoid the strong southerly currents further out to sea.

History 
The light was first considered in 1931 but only constructed in 1950. Its lantern enclosure was taken from an unknown late-19th-century lighthouse. It is currently solar powered.

Site operation 
The light is operated by the Australian Maritime Safety Authority, while the site is managed by Department of Environment, Climate Change and Water as part of the Botany Bay National Park.

Visiting 
The site is open, and accessible by a hike of about 2.5 hours round trip from the end of Solander Road in Kurnell, but the tower is closed.

See also 

 List of lighthouses in Australia

References

Notes

General references

External links 

 Grant and Tracey's Lighthouse Pages – Cape Baily Light

Lighthouses completed in 1950
Botany Bay
Lighthouses in Sydney
1950 establishments in Australia
Commonwealth Heritage List places in New South Wales